BL3 could refer to:

 BL3, a postcode district in the BL postcode area
 Biosafety level 3
 Borderlands 3